Zoe is an unincorporated community in Lee County, Kentucky, United States.  It lies north of the city of Beattyville, the county seat of Lee County, along Route 11.  Its elevation is 1,145 feet (349 m).  It has a post office with the ZIP code 41397.

References

Unincorporated communities in Lee County, Kentucky
Unincorporated communities in Kentucky